is a railway station on the Hakushin Line operated by East Japan Railway Company (JR East) in Higashi-ku, Niigata, Japan.

Lines

Station layout

The station consists of two ground-level opposed side platforms serving two tracks, connected by a footbridge, with the station building located on the south side. The station is located next to Niigata Freight Terminal.

Platforms

History
The station opened on 2 October 1978. Prior to this, a single 100 m long temporary platform was provided on what is now the up line from 1 February 1958 to serve the adjoining marshalling yard which opened on 1 October 1957. In September 1978, the line was double-tracked, and a new platform and station building was constructed on the down line a distance of 200 m to the north of the up line platform, earning the station the nickname "the most inconvenient station in Japan". The station was subsequently remodelled, with the down platform and station building moved to the present-day location on the south side of the freight yard.

With the privatization of Japanese National Railways (JNR) on 1 April 1987, the station came under the control of JR East. Elevators from the platform level to the overpass were installed on February 18, 2017.

Passenger statistics
In fiscal year 2018, the station was used by an average of 1769 passengers daily (boarding passengers only). This was a 1.67% reduction compared to the levels during fiscal year 2017 of 1799 passengers daily.

Surrounding area
The station is located in a semi-rural residential area. JR Freight's Niigata Freight Terminal is located next to the station. JR East's Niigata Shinkansen Depot lies on the north side of the freight terminal.

See also
 List of railway stations in Japan

References

External links

  

Railway stations in Japan opened in 1978
Railway stations in Niigata (city)
Hakushin Line
Stations of East Japan Railway Company